Cholemia is a condition caused by the presence of excess bile in the blood.  Its symptoms can include somnolence (drowsiness), yellow tinge to skin and whites of eyes, fatigue, nausea and, in extreme cases, coma.  It is often an early sign of liver disease.

Cause
Cholemia is caused by a blood disorder caused by genetic factors. As a result of obstruction of bile duct, buildup of bile acids (taurocholic and glycocholic acids) affects the central nervous system, irritation of the vagus nerve causing arrhythmias, direct tissue damage, hypercholesterolemia and hyperbillirubinemia.

Diagnosis
There is no specific diagnostic test for this condition. It is usually detected by colonoscopy. It is caused by a disease of the liver. It is most commonly seen in patients with hepatitis b. It's confirmed by the diagnosis as it shows a higher level of bilirubin ( <3 mg/dl ) but it is necessary to rule out liver diseases if the diagnosis is uncertain.

Treatment
Treatment aims to prevent the fast breakdown of red blood cells causing high bile in blood. Cholemia is currently untreatable.

References

Further reading

External links 

Blood disorders